"Crystals" is a song written and recorded by Icelandic indie folk/indie pop band Of Monsters and Men. It is the lead single for their second studio album, Beneath the Skin.
The single and album artwork was created by artistic director Leif Podhajsky. The song appeared in The CW's "Dare to Defy" promo as well as the first trailer for Disney and Pixar's The Good Dinosaur. The song was also featured in the soundtrack for the 2015 video game FIFA 16.

Track listing

Music video
A music video was released on May 11, 2015. the video features Nanna Bryndís Hilmarsdóttir dressed as a gypsy wearing beads on her eyes. The video takes place in a warehouse where the band members are dressed as workers and Nanna is seen helping them create a monster. As the video goes, she and the members put strange things in a machine and the video ends with them successfully creating what appears to be a girlish creature with crystal eyes.

Lyric video
A lyric video was released on March 16, 2015 featuring Icelandic actor Siggi Sigurjóns.

Charts

Weekly charts

Year-end charts

References

External links
 

2015 singles
2015 songs
Of Monsters and Men songs
Republic Records singles